Ambrósio Leitão da Cunha, the Baron of Mamoré (21 August 1825 – 5 December 1898) was a Brazilian lawyer and politician who served as a senator in the Empire of Brazil from 1870 to 1889. He also served as president of the provinces of Pará, Paraíba, Pernambuco, Maranhão, and Bahia.

References

1825 births
1898 deaths
People from Belém
Members of the Senate of the Empire of Brazil
Governors of Pará (Empire of Brazil)
Governors of Paraíba (Empire of Brazil)
Governors of Pernambuco (Empire of Brazil)
Governors of Maranhão (Empire of Brazil)
Governors of Bahia (Empire of Brazil)